Sakassou is a town in central Ivory Coast. It is a sub-prefecture of and the seat of Sakassou Department in Gbêkê Region, Vallée du Bandama District. Sakassou is also a commune.

In 2021, the population of the sub-prefecture of Sakassou was 69,386.

Villages
The 89 villages of the sub-prefecture of Sakassou and their population in 2014 are:

Notes

Sub-prefectures of Gbêkê
Communes of Gbêkê